Not My Fault: Mexico is a Mexican drama streaming television series produced by BTF Media and Star Original Productions for The Walt Disney Company. The series is part of the three-part Not My Fault anthology series dealing with the issues of violence against women and femicide, which includes two other series, one each from Colombia and one from Brazil. In Mexico, the series premiered as an original series on September 17, 2021, on Star+.

Plot  
The anthology series Not My Fault deals with the topics of violence against women and femicide. In addition to storylines that span the entire series, each individual episode also tells its own story that explores both of these broad themes. These stories are based on real experiences that women of different ages, backgrounds and social classes have had and are still experiencing.

Nurse Mariana's life takes a tragic turn when her little sister, Liliana, who she cared for after the death of her parents, disappears without a trace. Some time later, Liliana's body is found and Mariana embarks on a tireless search to find out who killed Liliana and what happened to her during the years of her disappearance. In her search for the truth, Mariana discovers that Liliana is just another digit in a startling statistic from a country that is failing to curb brutal violence against women. Her pain encourages Mariana to help other women and to honor the life Liliana was taken from. As time goes on, Mariana gets to know more and more people who have been through terrible things and are struggling with anger, sadness, shame and fear. Mariana and others make it their goal to fight for justice through protests and other actions and to draw attention to the problems and provide information.

Cast 
 Paulina Gaitán as Mariana Zúñiga Lara
 Giovanna Utrilla as Liliana "Lili" Zúñiga Lara
 Damián Alcázar as Pedro
 Raúl Méndez as Santos
 Gonzalo Vega Jr. as Erick
 Vicky Araico as Beatriz García Pérez
 Rebeca Manríquez as Adela
 Paloma Alvamar as Rosa Sánchez Tetla
 Regina Alcalá as Ingrid
 Leidi Gutiérrez as Daniela „Dani“ Mendoza García
 Esmeralda Pimentel as Cecilia „Ceci“
 Lisa Owen as Gloria
 Andrea Chaparro as Rosaura
 Luz María Zetina as Sofía
 Yatzini Aparicio as Andrea
 Pía Watson as Flor
 Alejandro de la Madrid as Adán

Episodes

See also 
Femicides in Ciudad Juárez

References

External links 
 
 

Television shows filmed in Mexico
2020s Mexican drama television series
2021 Mexican television series debuts
Spanish-language television shows
Star+ original programming